Rebecca Egan is a British actress known mostly for the role of Marilyn Tanner in the Second Sight series, and has been seen in the guest role of Kendra Hills-Smythe in the soap opera EastEnders.

The daughter of Myra Frances (1943–2021) and Robert Taylor, and step-daughter of Peter Egan (born 1946), all actors, her first television appearance was in an episode of Cardiac Arrest in 1996 as a doctor. After a few bit parts in television series, Egan was given the role of Marilyn Tanner for the television film Second Sight in 1999. Its success brought on three sequels, all released in 2000, and led to Egan landing bigger parts in more well-known television series such as Murder in Mind, Holby City, Midsomer Murders, Doctors, The Bill and Casualty.

References

External links
 

Living people
British actresses
Year of birth missing (living people)